Nepenthosyrphus oudemansi is a species of hoverfly in the family Syrphidae.

Distribution
Borneo.

References

Insects described in 1932
Eristalinae
Diptera of Asia
Taxa named by Johannes C. H. de Meijere